Katya Chamma is the self-titled first studio album by Brazilian singer-songwriter Katya Chamma. It was released on 2003 by Independent record label. Its music incorporates a mix of Pop rock, Blues and Música popular brasileira. The album features twelve composition (ten original compositions by Katya Chamma).

The album received generally positive reviews from music critics. The Jornal das Gravadoras (Brazilian Periodical of the Recorders) pointed Katya Chamma as one of the illustrious representative greaters of Brazilian independent music and Example of independent art (edition 106).

Track listing

References

Other sources

External links
Recording data, images and more info

2003 debut albums